The Lavender Bath Lady is a 1922 American silent comedy film directed by King Baggot and written by George Randolph Chester and Doris Schroeder. The film stars Gladys Walton, Charlotte Pierce, Edmund Burns, Tom Ricketts, Lydia Yeamans Titus, and Mary Winston. The film was released on November 13, 1922, by Universal Film Manufacturing Company.

Cast          
Gladys Walton as Mamie Conroy
Charlotte Pierce as Jeanette Gregory
Edmund Burns as David Bruce
Tom Ricketts as Simon Gregory
Lydia Yeamans Titus as Maggie
Mary Winston as Susanne
Albert MacQuarrie as Dorgan
Harry Lorraine as Drake
Earl Crain as Hallet

Preservation
As no copies of The Lavender Bath Lady are listed by any film archive, it is a lost film.

References

External links

1922 films
1920s English-language films
Silent American comedy films
Universal Pictures films
Films directed by King Baggot
American silent feature films
American black-and-white films
1922 comedy films
1920s American films